Asa Somers (born December 5, 1969) is an American stage, film, and television actor.

Education 
He is an alumnus of the Phillips Exeter Academy and earned a Bachelor of Arts degree in English literature and theatre studies at Yale University.

Career

Stage work
Somers made his Broadway debut in The Rocky Horror Show as a Phantom and Narrator understudy, then went on to join the original Broadway casts of Dance of the Vampires as Herbert, Taboo as the fight captain and standby for Boy George, Grey Gardens as a standby for Joe and Jerry, and Next to Normal.

He was also in the Off Broadway productions of Once Around The Sun as Kevin at the Zipper Theatre, the Playwrights Horizons production of The Burnt Part Boys as Miner Taylor, Hedwig and the Angry Inch as Hedwig at the Jane Street Theatre, and Next to Normal as Dr. Madden/Dr. Fine at the Second Stage Theatre.

Somers originated Dan in the U.S. national tour cast of Next to Normal, alongside 
Alice Ripley, Emma Hunton, Curt Hansen, and Jeremy Kushnier and stayed with the production until its close on July 30, 2011.

Somers recently revived his role as Dan Goodman in Penn State's CentreStage production of Next to Normal, which played at the Pavilion Theatre from June 6 to 14, 2014.

As of December 2016, he is a standby for the role of Larry Murphy in Dear Evan Hansen on Broadway.

Something As Big As This 
Somers' rock musical, Something As Big As This, had a closed developmental reading on July 2, 2012. The reading cast included former Next to Normal cast members, Brian d'Arcy James, Preston Sadleir, and Emma Hunton and was directed by Louis Hobson.

The show will have a free public presentation at Seattle's Balagan Theatre on January 14, 2013. The workshop features a different cast than the 2012 closed reading but is directed by Louis Hobson, who also directed the reading.

Regional theatre
Somers appeared in the regional theatre productions of Kean as Edmund Kean at Yale University, We're All Dead as Oedipus Rex at the Blue Heron Arts Center, Hedwig and the Angry Inch as Hedwig at the Victoria Theatre in San Francisco, Hair as Berger at the Theatre Under The Stars in Houston, Man In The White Suit as Michael at New York Stage & Film, and Tallgrass Gothic as Daniel at the Actors Theatre of Louisville.

Somers recently finished a run at Dallas Theater Center, where he played The Narrator in Fly By Night, April 26 to May 26, 2013.

Television work
In 2000, Somers appeared as Blaine Richardson in The Sopranos episode "D-Girl."  In 2003, he played the paramedic in Whoopi in the episode "Once Bitten."  He appears as Chaz in the pilot episode of The Wedding Album. In 2007, Somers plays Mike Conneally in the Law & Order episode "Over Here."  He has appeared twice in Law & Order: Special Victims Unit as Craig Vattic in the episode "Game" and as Colin Andrews in the episode "Smut."  Somers is also a restaurant customer in the 2009 Ugly Betty episode "Blue on Blue" and plays Mr. Harper in The Good Wife episode "Heart."  He recently appeared in Royal Pains and in Gossip Girl as Richard Wellings in the episode "It's a Dad, Dad, Dad, Dad World." In 2012, Somers played the Doctor in the second episode of Elementary, "While You Were Sleeping."

Film work
Somers co-stars as Kyle Cassimer in the 2009 independent film Clear Blue Tuesday, a rock musical revolving around the September 11 attacks, which opened at the Quad Cinema in Greenwich Village.  He is featured in the independent films Never Forever as Rich, which was shown at the 2007 Sundance Film Festival, and Ira & Abby as Gus. Somers also appears in the shorts A Change of Climate as Eddie, When Stars Fall as Capella, and No, No Now as Adrian Lanes.

Filmography

Film

Television

Video games

References

External links
 
 
 Asa Somers Official Website

American male film actors
American male stage actors
Place of birth missing (living people)
American male musical theatre actors
Living people
1969 births
Yale University alumni